Sir Walter Galpin Alcock  (29 December 186111 September 1947) was an English organist and composer. He held a number of prominent positions as an organist and played at the coronations of three monarchs. He was  professor of organ in the Royal College of Music, London.

Life and career
Alcock was born at Edenbridge, Kent. At the age of 15 he won a scholarship to the National Training School for Music, where he studied composition with Arthur Sullivan and the organ with John Stainer.

After a brief series of posts (Holy Trinity Sloane Street and St. Margaret's, Westminster), in 1893 he was appointed Organ Professor at the Royal College of Music. He was assistant organist of Westminster Abbey from 1896, and was concurrently organist of the Chapels Royal from 1902.  In 1916 he became organist of Salisbury Cathedral where he oversaw a strictly faithful restoration of the famous Father Willis organ, even going to such lengths as to refuse to allow parts of the instrument to leave the cathedral in case any unauthorised tonal alteration were made without his knowledge while allowing some discreet additions in the original style of the organ (as well as modernisation of the organ's actions) by Henry Willis III, the grandson of Father Willis.

Alcock had the unique distinction of playing the organ at Westminster Abbey at the coronations of three kings: Edward VII (1902), George V (1911) and George VI (1937).

Between 1917 and 1924, Alcock, with Charles Harford Lloyd, juggled the post of Director of the Madrigal Society, to assist the ageing Sir Frederick Bridge, who had been appointed to the role in 1888.

Alcock was knighted in 1933 for services to music. He was a distinguished teacher, whose published material for organ students is still thought valuable. Among his notable pupils were Edward Bairstow, Ralph Downes, and S. Drummond Wolff.

His hobbies included the construction of a model railway, on which choirboys at Salisbury would be given rides.

Alcock died at the age of 85. His funeral service was in Salisbury Cathedral.

In an obituary tribute Sir Thomas Armstrong wrote of "his firm foundations of good musicianship and sound tradition" and added:

Family
Walter Galpin Alcock was the son of Walter William Alcock and Mary Galpin. In 1871 Walter William was the superintendent of the Metropolitan Police Orphanage at Fortescue House, Twickenham.

In 1893 Alcock married Naomi Blanche Lucas. They had one son and five daughters. The eldest daughter, Naomi Judith, married Dingwall Bateson in 1922.

Notes

External links
Recordings by Alcock

1861 births
1947 deaths
20th-century English composers
English classical organists
British male organists
People from Edenbridge, Kent
Academics of the Royal College of Music
Knights Bachelor
Musicians awarded knighthoods
Composers awarded knighthoods
Members of the Royal Victorian Order
Musicians from Kent
20th-century British male musicians
20th-century British musicians
Male classical organists